The Afghanistan–Pakistan border barrier refers to the border barrier being built by Pakistan since March 2017 along its border with Afghanistan. The purpose of barrier is to prevent terrorism, arms, and drug trafficking, as well refugees, illegal immigration, smuggling and infiltration across the approximately  international border between Afghanistan and Pakistan. 

The Afghanistan–Pakistan border is marked by five official crossing points. There are over 400 forts in the northwestern area alone, with cameras, watchtowers, and more than 800 drones assisting the barrier. The barrier and other measures are designed to impede the Afghan Taliban and Pakistani Taliban from freely crossing the border to coordinate and launch attacks against the governments of Afghanistan and Pakistan and evade authorities on either side. Despite the two Taliban organizations claiming to be completely separate from each other, Afghan Taliban leaders have been found operating from Afghan refugee camps in Pakistan and Pakistani Taliban leaders have been found hiding from Pakistani law enforcement in Afghanistan while systemically coordinating a joint militant network with their Afghan counterparts.

Initial fencing plans
In September 2005, Pakistan stated it had plans to build a  fence along its border with Afghanistan to prevent insurgents and drug smugglers slipping between the two countries. The initially proposed fortifications and fence was backed by the United States in 2005. Major General Shaukat Sultan, a former Pakistani military spokesman, said the move was necessary to block the infiltration of militants across the border into Pakistan. Former Pakistani President Pervez Musharraf later offered to mine the border as well.

The plans to fence and mine the border were again considered in 2007 and then in 2009, but they were not fully implemented. However, a  portion along selected border areas was fenced and the work was discontinued for lack of funds. In June 2011, Major General Athar Abbas, the then spokesman for the army, said: "We did fence around 35km of the border area as it faced continuous militant incursions. It was a joint project of ISAF and Afghanistan. But then they backed out. It was a very costly project." During the Musharraf period, a biometric system was installed by Pakistan on border crossings. Afghanistan had objected to the system. The bio-metric system remains intact at the border, although it is yet to be made fully functional.

Afghan opposition

Pakistani plans for fortifying, fencing and mining the border were renewed on 26 December 2006, but these plans were opposed by the Afghan government, citing that the fencing would result in "the limitation of the freedom of movement of tribal peoples". Due to Afghanistan's fierce opposition to the border fencing, the Angur Ada and Sheken areas saw a series of armed border skirmishes that resulted in cross−border artillery strikes launched by Pakistan in April 2007. On 1 April 2013, the Afghan Foreign Ministry formally protested and raised "grave concerns" over what it called "the Pakistani military's unilateral construction and physical reinforcement activities along the Afghanistan–Pakistan border in eastern Nangarhar province".

In Afghanistan some groups do not recognize the Durand Line itself as a legitimate border between it and Pakistan, as it divides the Pashtun tribes who live on both sides of the border. They contend that the installation of a physical barrier would divide people and make this border permanent.

Construction progress and trenches
In June 2016, after three years of construction, Pakistan completed a  trench along its border with Afghanistan from Balochistan to ensure proper border management. The initial excavation was largely carried out by the paramilitary Frontier Corps. The purpose of the trench is to tighten border security and create more favourable conditions for Pakistani security forces responsible for patrolling the border by deterring and restricting the flow of unauthorized entities, such as narcotics, militants, smugglers and general illegal movements of Afghan civilians or refugees. Three private construction companies out of Pakistan's Balochistan province were contracted to supply manpower and oversee the arrangement of necessary equipment. The  and  trench is planned to be extended along the whole border.

The fencing is about 94% complete as of 5 January 2022, and on 21 January 2022 the Interior Minister of Pakistan stated that only 20 km remains to be fenced in total.

The project is predicted to cost at least $532 million.

See also
 Afghanistan–Pakistan relations
 Afghanistan–Pakistan border skirmishes
 Land border crossings of Pakistan

References

Fences
Walls
Border barriers
Geography of Afghanistan
 
Border